Eripus is a genus of beetles in the family Carabidae, containing the following species:

 Eripus breedlovei Straneo & Ball, 1989
 Eripus franzi Straneo & Ball, 1989 
 Eripus globipennis (Chaudoir, 1866) 
 Eripus microphthalmus (Chaudoir, 1866) 
 Eripus nitidus (Chaudoir, 1861) 
 Eripus oaxacanus Straneo & Ball, 1989 
 Eripus scydmaenoides Dejean, 1829 
 Eripus subcoecus (Chaudoir, 1866) 
 Eripus suturalis (Chaudoir, 1861)

References

Panagaeinae